Robert Jan Stips is a Dutch musician born in The Hague, 4 February 1950.

He initially found fame as a keyboard player, arranger, and producer with the group Supersister. This led to an invitation to join Golden Earring, one of the most successful Dutch groups of the time. In 1975, Stips appeared on the group's follow-up to their smash hit Moontan (including their international hit, "Radar Love"). Entitled Switch, this follow-up album featured Stips' playing throughout. In 1976, Stips appeared as a full-fledged band member on To the Hilt. This album would prove to be his last full effort with the group. Stips also took part in the group's successful American tour in 1976, but left afterwards to form Stars & Stips which released Nevergreens in 1976, and the group Sweet d'Buster with fellow intermittent Golden Earring bandmember, saxophonist Bertus Borgers. Stips has guested on several Golden Earring efforts since.

In 1979, Stips left Sweet d'Buster and formed Transister, which released one album: Zig Zag. In 1981, Robert Jan Stips released his first solo LP (U.P.). The same year, Stips became the keyboard player for The Nits, with whom he had previously worked as a producer. During his years with The Nits he also produced albums for Cloud Nine and Vitesse. He was the main composer of The Nits' orchestral work, Hjuvi - A Rhapsody in Time. In 1982 Stips appeared on Golden Earring's Cut release. It featured the group's worldwide hit "Twilight Zone". Stips also plays on the group's 1986 release The Hole.

Robert Jan Stips left Nits in 1996 at the end of their Greatest Hits tour, and launched the group STIPS, with which he brought out the album Egotrip. STIPS released two albums in collaboration with Freek de Jonge, Gemeen Goed (1997) and Rapsodia (1998). In 1999, Robert Jan Stips released two solo albums : Greyhound and Rembrandt 2000 (at the occasion of a great exhibition Rembrandt in The Hague). He also appeared on Golden Earring's "Last Blast of the Century." A two disc live career retrospective. In 2003, he rejoined Nits for their thirtieth anniversary tour. He played on the subsequent albums and has continued to tour with the group.

Discography 
1970 Supersister - Present From Nancy
1971 Supersister - To The Highest Bidder
1972 Supersister - Pudding en Gisteren
1973 Supersister - Iskander
1974 Sweet Okay Supersister - Spiral Staircase
1975 Golden Earring - Switch
1976 Golden Earring - To The Hilt
1976 Stars & Stips - Nevergreens
1977 Sweet d'Buster - Sweet d'Buster
1978 Sweet d'Buster - Friction
1979 Transister - Zig Zag
1981 Robert Jan Stips - U.P.
1981 The Nits - New Flat
1982 Golden Earring - Cut
1983 The Nits - Omsk
1983 The Nits - Kilo
1984 The Nits - Adieu, Sweet Bahnhof
1986 The Nits - Henk
1986 Golden Earring - The Hole
1987 The Nits - In The Dutch Mountains
1988 The Nits - Hat
1989 Nits - Urk
1990 Nits - Giant Normal Dwarf
1992 Nits - Ting
1992 Nits - Hjuvi: A Rhapsody In Time
1995 Nits - dA dA dA
1996 Nits - In Concert
1996 S.T.I.P.S. - Egotrip
1997 Freek de Jonge & STIPS - Gemeen Goed
1998 Freek de Jonge & STIPS - Rapsodia
1998 Robert Jan Stips - Greyhound
1999 Robert Jan Stips - Rembrandt 2000
2000 Supersister - Memories Are New - M.A.N.
2001 Supersister - Supersisterious
2005 Nits - Les Nuits
2008 Nits - Doing The Dishes
2008 Nits - Truce Diaries
2009 Nits - Strawberry Wood
2009 Robert Jan Stips - Rond: Piano & Songs
2012 Nits - Malpensa
2012 Robert Jan Stips - 12 Steden, 13 Ongelukken
2014 RJ Stips / W Stips - KIND van 70 
2015 Nits - Hotel Europa
2015 Robert Jan Stips - RJ's Tribute To 55 Years Golden Earring
2015 Robert Jan Stips - Don't Lose Heart / Verlies Niet de Moed
2016 Robert Jan Stips - Present To The Highest Pudding: Three Supersister albums played on three grand pianos simultaneously 
2017 Nits - angst
2017 Fabelhaft - O Die Zee - 11 Songs
2019 Supersister Projekt 2019 - Retsis Repus
2019 Nits - Knot

Filmography
 2015: Romantic Warriors III: Canterbury Tales (DVD)

References

External links 
 http://www.stips.net/

1950 births
Living people
Dutch musicians
Musicians from The Hague
Knights of the Order of Orange-Nassau
Golden Earring members